Matthew Joseph Liberatore (born November 6, 1999) is an American professional baseball pitcher for the St. Louis Cardinals of Major League Baseball (MLB). 

Born and raised in the suburbs of Phoenix, Arizona, Liberatore was selected by the Tampa Bay Rays in the first round of the 2018 Major League Baseball draft out of high school. He signed with the Rays and played in their minor league system for two seasons before he was traded to the Cardinals prior to the 2020 season. He played in their minor league system before making his MLB debut in 2022.

Amateur career
Liberatore graduated from Mountain Ridge High School in Glendale, Arizona. In July 2017, he played in the Under Armour All-America Baseball Game and was named the game's most valuable player after throwing three scoreless innings. Later in the summer, he played for the USA Baseball 18U National Team. As a senior at Mountain Ridge in 2018, he posted an 8–1 win–loss record with a 0.93 earned run average (ERA) with 104 strikeouts in  innings and was named Arizona's Gatorade Baseball Player of the Year.

Liberatore committed to the University of Arizona to play college baseball.

Professional career

Tampa Bay Rays
The Tampa Bay Rays selected Liberatore in the first round, with the 16th overall selection, in the 2018 Major League Baseball draft. He signed with the team for a $3.5 million signing bonus. He was assigned to the Gulf Coast Rays of the Rookie-level Gulf Coast League. After posting a 0.98 ERA in eight starts, Liberatore was promoted to the Princeton Rays of the Advanced Rookie Appalachian League. He pitched in one game for Princeton to end his first professional season. Liberatore began the 2019 season in extended spring training before he was assigned to the Bowling Green Hot Rods of the Class A Midwest League on May 15, with whom he spent the remainder of the year. Over 16 games (15 starts), Liberatore went 6–2 with a 3.10 ERA, striking out 76 batters over  innings.

St. Louis Cardinals
On January 9, 2020, Liberatore was traded to the St. Louis Cardinals (along with Edgardo Rodriguez and the Rays’ Competitive Balance Round B Draft Pick) in exchange for José Martínez, Randy Arozarena, and the Cardinals’ Competitive Balance Round A Draft Pick. He did not play in a minor league game in 2020 due to the cancellation of the season due to the COVID-19 pandemic. For the 2021 season, Liberatore was assigned to the Memphis Redbirds of the Triple-A East.

In late May, he was placed on the temporarily inactive list while he competed for a spot on the United States national baseball team, in advance of the 2020 Summer Olympics. He was subsequently named to the roster of the national team for the Americas Qualifying Event. Team USA qualified for the Olympics, but Liberatore was ultimately not named to the roster in part due to the Cardinals' lack of organizational depth. In June, he was selected to represent the Cardinals (alongside Nolan Gorman) in the All-Star Futures Game at Coors Field. Over 22 games (18 starts) with Memphis, Liberatore went 9–9 with a 4.04 ERA and 123 strikeouts over  innings. The Cardinals named him their Minor League Pitcher of the Year.

Liberatore returned to Memphis to begin the 2022 season. After going 3-3 with a 3.83 ERA and 46 strikeouts over forty innings, the Cardinals announced on May 19 that they would be selecting his contract and promoting him to the major leagues. He made his MLB debut on May 21 as the starting pitcher versus the Pittsburgh Pirates, throwing  innings and giving up seven hits, four earned runs, and two walks while striking out three. They optioned him back to Memphis the next day, but he was recalled one day later after Steven Matz was placed on the injured list. On May 29, he earned his first career win, tossing 5.0 scoreless innings against the Milwaukee Brewers while striking out 6.

Personal life
Liberatore has been friends with fellow 2018 first round pick and Cardinals teammate, Nolan Gorman, since they were five.

References

External links

1999 births
Living people
People from Peoria, Arizona
Baseball players from Arizona
Major League Baseball pitchers
St. Louis Cardinals players
Gulf Coast Rays players
Princeton Rays players
Bowling Green Hot Rods players
Memphis Redbirds players
United States national baseball team players